Vanaprastham: The Last Dance is a 1999 Indo-French psychological drama period film in Malayalam-language that was directed by Shaji N. Karun. It was produced by Pierre Assouline and co-produced by Mohanlal. The screenplay was written by Karun and Raghunath Paleri (who also wrote the dialogues) based on a story by Assouline. It features Mohanlal in the lead role, with Suhasini Maniratnam, Mattannur Sankarankutty Marar, Kalamandalam Gopi, Venmani Haridas, and Kukku Parameshwaram in supporting roles. The film's music was composed by Zakir Hussain.

Set in the 1950s in Travancore, the plot follows a lower-caste Kathakali artist Kunjikuttan (Mohanlal). Subhadra (Suhasini), a member of an aristocratic family sees him perform Arjuna. Lost between reality and fiction she falls in love with the character. Their relationship leads to the birth of a child, who is hidden away by Subhadra from Kunjikuttan for almost a lifetime.

The film premiered at the 1999 Cannes Film Festival on 21 May 1999, where it was selected at the Un Certain Regard section, and was theatrically released in France on 13 October 1999 and in India in January 2000. The film was nominated for the Grand Jury Prize at the American Film Institute's 1999 AFI Fest (Los Angeles International Film Festival). It won the Special Prize of the Jury at the Istanbul International Film Festival and the FIPRESCI prize at the Mumbai International Film Festival. The film won three awards at the 47th National Film Awards—Best Feature Film, Best Actor (Mohanlal), and Best Editing (A. Sreekar Prasad), and six awards at the 1999 Kerala State Film Awards, including Best Director and Best Actor (Mohanlal). In 2014, Vanaprastham was screened retrospective at the 45th International Film Festival of India in the Celebrating Dance in Indian cinema section.

Plot

The story revolves around a male Kathakali artist Kunhikuttan, an admirable and respected performer but a member of a lower caste. He struggles to come to terms with the rejection and estrangement of his father, a member of an upper caste who denies his son. Poor, unhappy, and stuck in an arranged marriage that provides no relief, he gets by for the sake of his daughter.

One night, whilst performing as Putana from Poothanamoksham from the epic Mahabharata on stage, his performance is witnessed by Subhadra, an educated and married upper-caste women, niece of the Dewan and an aspiring composer. Impressed by his performance she invites him to play Arjuna in her adaptation of Subhadraharanam. Defying the norms of India's rigid caste system, the two have an affair which results in a son.

But it soon becomes clear that Subhadra loves the character Arjuna from his stage performances, and not Kunhikuttan the artist. More in love with the valiant, noble hero of the Mahabharata, than the lower-caste dancer Kunhikuttan, she rejects him and refuses to let him see his son.

Denied access to his son, and rejected by his father, Kunhikuttan returns to the stage, leaving behind his hero roles to play demonic characters, reaching within the dark corners of his mind, becoming increasingly resentful and full of anger, until one last dance which brings the feature to a stunning end Subhadraharanam.

Cast
Mohanlal as Kunjikuttan
Suhasini Mani Ratnam as Subhadra
Mattannur Sankarankutty Marar as Raman
Kukku Parameswaran as Savithri
Venmani Haridas as Vasu Namboothiri
Kalamandalam Gopi as Kunju Nair
Venmani Vishnu as Pisharadi
Kalamandalam Kesavan as Thirumeni
Bindu Panicker as Bhageerathi
Sindhu Shyam
Arun as Child Kunhikuttan

Release
The film premiered at the 1999 Cannes Film Festival on 21 May 1999, where it was selected at the Un Certain Regard section. In 2014, the film was screened retrospective during the 45th International Film Festival of India in the Celebrating Dance in Indian cinema section.

Writing for Variety, film critic Emanuel Levy said that "The Last Dance, which marks noted Indian cinematographer-director Shaji Karun's third appearance in Cannes, is an elaborately produced, exceedingly handsome period film about the art form of Kathakali, which combines dance, pantomime and theater [...] Through his meticulous mise-en-scene and well-crafted production, director Karun offers poignant commentary on the political and mythic role of artists in a rapidly changing society, and the fine line between the characters they play onstage and off".

Prem Panickar of Rediff wrote, "From a viewer's point of view, it is interesting that after watching the film, you come away talking of the passionate 'virtual love story', of the stunning visuals, of Mohanlal's brilliance and Suhasini's surcharged performance -- but rarely, if ever, of the director. Perhaps that is Shaji N Karun's biggest victory. He is there, in the meticulously etched story and the sparse, telling dialogues. He is there in the use of Kathakali as a medium -- inspired, perhaps, by his mentor, the late Malayalam auteur Aravindan's 1988 opus, Marattam."

Awards
The film has been nominated for the following awards since its release:

1999 Cannes Film Festival
Competed at the Un Certain Regard section

1999 AFI Fest (United States)
Nominated - Grand Jury Prize - Shaji N. Karun

1999 Istanbul International Film Festival
Won - Special Prize of the Jury - Shaji N. Karun

1999 Mumbai International Film Festival
Won - FIPRESCI prize - Shaji N. Karun

47th National Film Awards
Won - Best Feature Film - Pierre Assouline, Mohanlal
Won - Best Actor - Mohanlal
Won - Best Editing - A. Sreekar Prasad, Joseph Guinvarch

1999 Kerala State Film Awards
Won - Best Actor - Mohanlal
Won - Best Director - Shaji N. Karun
Won - Best Editor - A. Sreekar Prasad, Joseph Guinvarch
Won - Best Sound Recordist - Lakshmy Narayana, Bruno Tarrière
Won - Best Processing Lab - Prasad Colour Lab
Won - Best Make-up Artist - M.O.Devasya, Saleem

1999 Filmfare Awards South
 Won - Best Actor in Malayalam - Mohanlal
 Won - Best Cinematographer – South - Santosh Sivan

Other awards
Won - Kerala Film Critics Association Awards for Best Actor - Mohanlal
Won - Mathrubhumi Film Award for Best Actor - Mohanlal

Soundtrack 

The music for the film was composed by Zakir Hussain. The soundtrack album was distributed by Universal Music France, it was released on 1 October 1999 in Europe.

Legacy
Vanaprastham was the first Indian film made in Panavision format. Mohanlal's performance in the film is often regarded by critics as one of the best performances in his career. Vanaprastham was Karun's third directorial after Piravi (1989) and Swaham (1994) and it was the third time his film getting selection at the Cannes Film Festival. After the screening of the film, the Government of France conferred him with the title Ordre des Arts et des Lettres (Chevalier); Karun responded that "I think they gave me the award because all three of my films were premiered at Cannes - a very rare honour". Impressed with his work in Vanaprastham, A. Sreekar Prasad was hired by Mani Ratnam for editing Alaipayuthey (their first collaboration), who later becomes his regular editor. In 2005, Mohanlal listed Vanaprastham in his list of top ten best Indian films of all time. In 2013, in an online poll conducted by CNN-IBN on their website as part of the 100 years celebration of Indian cinema, Vanaprastham came ninth in the poll for finding the "greatest Indian film ever". In 2016, on the occasion of India celebrating its 70th Independence day, news agency NDTV compiled a list called "70 Years, 70 Great Films" and Vanaprastham was among the four Malayalam films that found place in the list.

References

External links

1999 films
1999 drama films
1990s psychological drama films
1990s Malayalam-language films
French dance films
Indian dance films
French psychological drama films
Indian psychological drama films
French independent films
Indian independent films
Films set in the 1930s
Kathakali
Films about the caste system in India
Pranavam Arts International films
Films directed by Shaji N. Karun
Films featuring a Best Actor National Award-winning performance
Best Feature Film National Film Award winners
Films whose editor won the Best Film Editing National Award
1990s French films